|}

The Nunthorpe Stakes is a Group 1 flat horse race in Great Britain open to horses aged two years or older. It is run at York over a distance of 5 furlongs (1,006 metres), and it is scheduled to take place each year in August.

History
The event is named after Nunthorpe, an area of York. The first version, a low-grade selling race, was established in 1903. The present version began in 1922, and the inaugural running was won by Two Step.

The race was sponsored by William Hill from 1976 to 1989, and during this period it was known as the William Hill Sprint Championship. It has had several different sponsors since then, and the latest is Coolmore Stud, which started supporting the event in 2007.

The Nunthorpe Stakes became part of the Breeders' Cup Challenge series in 2011. The winner of the race now earns an automatic invitation to compete in the same year's Breeders' Cup Turf Sprint.

The event is one of a limited number of races in which two-year-old horses can compete against their elders. The first juvenile to win was High Treason in 1953, and the most recent was Kingsgate Native in 2007. It is also the only Group 1 race in Great Britain open to two-year-old geldings.

The Nunthorpe Stakes is currently held on the third day of York's four-day Ebor Festival meeting and has been a Group 1 race since 1984.

Records
Most successful horse (3 wins):
 Tag End – 1928, 1929, 1930
 Sharpo – 1980, 1981, 1982

Other repeat winners (2 wins):
 Highborn – 1926, 1927
 Linklater – 1942, 1943
 Abernant – 1949, 1950
 Royal Serenade – 1951, 1952
 Right Boy – 1958, 1959
 Borderlescott – 2008, 2009
 Mecca's Angel – 2015, 2016
 Battaash – 2019, 2020

Leading jockey (7 wins):
 Lester Piggott – Right Boy (1958, 1959), Matatina (1963), Caterina (1966), Tower Walk (1969), Swing Easy (1971), Solinus (1978)

Leading trainer (5 wins):
 Ossie Bell – Highborn II (1926, 1927), Greenore (1932), Concerto (1933), Ipsden (1937)

Leading owner (3 wins):
 Sir Hugo Cunliffe-Owen – Highborn II (1926, 1927), Concerto (1933)
 Jack Joel – Tag End (1928, 1929, 1930)
 Monica Sheriffe – Sharpo (1980, 1981, 1982)

Winners

See also
 Horse racing in Great Britain
 List of British flat horse races

References

 Paris-Turf: 
 Racing Post:

 galopp-sieger.de – Nunthorpe Stakes.
 ifhaonline.org – International Federation of Horseracing Authorities – Nunthorpe Stakes (2019).
 pedigreequery.com – Nunthorpe Stakes – York.
 
 Race Recordings 

Flat races in Great Britain
York Racecourse
Open sprint category horse races
Breeders' Cup Challenge series
Recurring sporting events established in 1922
British Champions Series
1922 establishments in England